Rimae Fresnel is a 90km-long arcuate escarpment on the Moon at . Both the escarpment and the nearby Promontorium Fresnel were named after the French physicist Augustin-Jean Fresnel.

References

External links

Rimae Fresnel at the Moon Wiki

Geological features on the Moon